Margaux is a French feminine given name.

Notable people 
Notable people with the name include:
Margaux Avril (born 1991), French singer
Margaux Châtelier (born 1990), French actress 
Margaux Dietz (born 1990), Swedish blogger
Margaux Farrell (born 1990), American swimmer
Margaux Fragoso (1979–2017), American author
Margaux Hemingway (1954–1996), American fashion model and actress
Margaux Isaksen (born 1991), American modern pentathlete 
Margaux Williamson (born 1976), Canadian painter, filmmaker, and writer

See also
Margeaux, Canadian entertainer

French feminine given names